Joe Thomas (born 13 February 1964) is an Australian former professional rugby league footballer who played for South Sydney, Canterbury, Western Suburbs and Illawarra in the NSWRL.

Biography
A Mascot junior, Thomas started his NSWRL career with South Sydney, playing as a lock forward. His first-grade appearances at South Sydney were limited by serious injuries.

Thomas was a hooker in Canterbury's 1988 premiership team, which defeated Balmain in the grand final. In his three seasons at Canterbury he played 55 first-grade games.

From 1991 to 1993 he played for Western Suburbs and while at the club made two representative appearances for NSW City. He was one of Western Suburb's captains during this period.

He finished his career with a season at Illawarra in 1994, then was appointed an assistant coach under Phil Gould at Eastern Suburbs.

Thomas's elderly mother Mary died in 2010 of head injuries sustained when she fell to the ground after being assaulted by a cyclist on an Eastlakes street. The attacker, Daniel Paul Wood, had got off his bike after passing the 71-year old and walked back 10-metres to push her in the chest, an altercation brought about by his belief she had been in his way. Wood, who was intoxicated, was charged with murder, but the court accepted a guilty plea for manslaughter, sentencing him to five-years in prison.

References

External links
Joe Thomas at Rugby League project

1964 births
Living people
Australian rugby league players
South Sydney Rabbitohs players
Canterbury-Bankstown Bulldogs players
Western Suburbs Magpies players
Illawarra Steelers players
New South Wales City Origin rugby league team players
Rugby league hookers
Rugby league players from Sydney